Tân Đức may refer to several places in Vietnam, including:

 Tân Đức, Cà Mau, a rural commune of Đầm Dơi District.
 , a rural commune of Hàm Tân District.
 , a rural commune of Phú Bình District.